Kalinovsky is a rural locality (a settlement) in Dmitro-Titovsky Selsoviet, Kytmanovsky District, Altai Krai, Russia. The population was 79 as of 2013. There is 1 street.

Geography 
Kalinovsky is located 24 km north of Kytmanovo (the district's administrative centre) by road. Petrushikha is the nearest rural locality.

References 

Rural localities in Kytmanovsky District